Bowlingly (often spelled 'Bolingly'), also known as Neale's Residence and The Ferry House, is a historic home located at Queenstown, Queen Anne's County, Maryland, United States. It is a large brick dwelling house constructed in 1733 on a bluff overlooking Queenstown Creek. The original house is a two-story brick structure that is seven bays long and one room deep, with flush brick chimneys at either end of the pitched gable roof. On August 13, 1813, a flotilla of British Royal Navy warships landed at Bowlingly's wharf during the War of 1812. British troops who disembarked from the warships proceeded to sack the home before being engaging the local Maryland militia.

The history of the property begins in September 1658 with a survey and then in January 1659 the Proprietor granted "James Bowling all that parcell of lands called Bowlingly lying ... on the east side of a creek in the said bay called Coursey's Creek, beginning at a marked cedar tree standing by a cove called Bowling's Cove".  James Bowling was mainly active in Charles County, Maryland and probably never lived at this site. In 1664, he transferred the property "Bowlingsley in Talbot County" to William Calvert (son of Leonard Calvert) and his wife Elizabeth. 

Bowlingly was listed on the National Register of Historic Places in 1972.

See also
Double School House Number 6

References

External links
, including photo from 1890, at Maryland Historical Trust

Houses on the National Register of Historic Places in Maryland
Houses in Queen Anne's County, Maryland
Houses completed in 1733
Historic American Buildings Survey in Maryland
National Register of Historic Places in Queen Anne's County, Maryland